David MacLean Parry (26 March 1852—12 May 1915) was an American industrialist and writer.

Biography
David MacLean Parry was born on a farm near Pittsburgh, Pennsylvania. He worked briefly as a clerk, a traveling salesman, a reporter on The New York Herald and later became a successful businessman. He was president of Parry Manufacturing Co., and Parry Oil and Pipe Line Co., the Parry Auto Co.

Parry served for a time as president of the American Educational Society, the Citizens' Industrial Association of America and the National Association of Manufacturers.

Parry was well known for being extremely hostile to labor unions and workers' rights. He authored the anti-socialistic dystopian novel The Scarlet Empire. The book was written as a satirical counterblast to Edward Bellamy's Looking Backward. He was a thirty-second degree Mason, a Shriner, and an Odd Fellow.

Works

 "Speech to the Convention of the National Association of Manufacturers, New Orleans, April 14, 1903," Indianapolis Journal, April 15, 1903, pg. 4.
 "The Necessity of Organization Among Employers," Science, Vol. XVII, No. 440, June 5, 1903.
 "What can a University Contribute to Preparation for Business Life?" In: Convention of Educators and Business Men for the Discussion of Higher Commercial Education. Ann Arbor: The Richmond & Backus Co., 1903.
  "The Employer's Side," Saturday Evening Post, October 1904.
 The Scarlet Empire. New York: Grosset & Dunlap, 1906.
 "David M. Parry, Author of 'The Scarlet Empire,' Replies to Socialists Criticism," The New York Times, April 15, 1906.
 "Automobile Sales and the Panic," The Annals of the American Academy of Political and Social Science, Vol. XXXIV, July/December 1909.
 "Mine—Property and Rights." In: Walton Hale Hamilton (ed.), Current Economic Problems, The University of Chicago Press, 1914.

See also
 Eugen Richter
 George F. Baer
 Henry Ward Beecher
 Morris Hillquit

References

Further reading
 Bossiere, C.R. La (1974). "The Scarlet Empire: Two Visions in One," Science Fiction Studies, Vol. 1, No. 4, pp. 290–292.
 Jones, Ellis O. (1906). "Parry and His Book," The Arena, Vol. 36, pp. 330–332.
 Marcosson, Isaac F. (1905). "The Fight for the 'Open Shop'," The World's Work, Vol. 11, pp. 6055–6965.
 Montgomery, David (1979). Workers' Control in America. Cambridge University Press.
 Pfaelzer, Jean (1984). The Utopian Novel in America 1886–1896: The Politics of Form. University of Pittsburgh Press.
 Robbins, Hayes (1904). "The Employers' Fight Against Organized Labor," World Today. Vol. 6, pp. 623–630
 Roemer, Kenneth R. (1976). The Obsolete Necessity: America in Utopian Writings, 1888–1900. Kent State University Press.
 Rubincam, Milton (1935). David M. Parry, of Indianapolis, and his Family, Hyattsville, Md.
 Rubincam, Milton (1938). "David M. Parry," Indiana Magazine of History, Vol. 34, No. 2, pp. 165–174.
 Rubincam, Milton (1947). "David M. Parry: Captain of Industry," Pennsylvanian, Vol. 5.
 Rubincam, Milton (1956). David MacLean Parry, 1852-1915, Studies in Ancestral Biography, No. 4, Hyattsville, Md.
 Simons, May Wood (1904). "Employer's Associations," The International Socialist Review, Vol. 5, No. 4, pp. 193–202.
 Stockton, Frank T. (1911). The Closed Shop in American Trade Unions. Johns Hopkins University Studies in Historical and Political Science, Series XXIX, No. 3.
 Wakstein, Allen M. (1964). "The Origins of the Open-Shop Movement, 1919-1920," The Journal of American History, Vol. 51, No. 3, pp. 460–475.
 White, Henry (1905). "The Issue of the Open and Closed Shop," The North American Review, Vol. 180, pp. 28–40.
 Willoughby, William Franklin (1905). "Employers' Associations for Dealing With Labor in the United States," The Quarterly Journal of Economics, Vol. 20, pp. 110–150.

External links

 The Scarlet Empire, at Hathi Trust
 Dystopian Predictions of Mankind's Reaction to Mechanical, Scientific and Moral Progress
 Parry Mansion in Golden Hill

1852 births
1915 deaths
19th-century American businesspeople
American company founders
People from Allegheny County, Pennsylvania